Seketoa was a fish god from Niuatoputapu and Tafahi in Tongan mythology.

Originally Seketoa was a mortal, the grandson of Puakatefisi, the first of the traditional line of rulers of Niuatoputapu island, the Māatu dynasty. Puakatefisi had a son by a concubine of his, named Falefehi. That son had two sons, the oldest with the name Moimoi, and the younger was called Seketoa. As common in Polynesia, the older son could command the younger in executing the orders of their father. Still Seketoa was more beloved by his father than Moimoi. Or so the latter believed, and he planned to kill his younger brother.

Moimoi ordered Seketoa to come to his house. The latter obeyed, and sat down outside the former's house, crosslegged with his head bowed and his hands clasped in front, awaiting orders as required by custom. Moimoi told him to come in. But Seketoa was suspicious and said that any commands could be given to him here. Soon Moimoi became angry, went inside and came out with a pōvai (big cudgel), and threw it at the other. But Seketoa jumped up so quickly that it missed him. Then he grabbed the club himself and yelling bakola (Fijian for: die you wrench) he ran with it towards the other. Moimoi resigned and did not defend himself: "Do what you like to me, Seketoa, for I am powerless."

Thereupon Seketoa threw down the club and said that he would go to drown himself in the sea and become a fish, leaving Moimoi behind to run the errands for Māatu. And he, Seketoa, would watch the seas of these islands until the end of the world, that no fish would ever kill a person, and Māatu would have the right to call him anytime and he then would come in the shape of a fish.

This is still the right of the real chief of Niuatoputapu. He will send out two of his matāpule (official chiefly spokesmen) to throw kava roots in the sea. That will attract two suckerfish, who are the matāpule of Seketoa. They will come and then go. Then a small shark comes and goes. And a medium shark comes and goes. And finally a big shark comes. That is Seketoa, and Māatu will speak to him.

Seketoa had an important contribution to the creation of Tafahi.

Seketoa is also known away from Niuatoputapu and Tafahi, but less widely and more vague. There he is sometimes named as the father of Ilaheva.

References

Fish gods
Tongan deities
Animal gods